Burntisland, Kinghorn and Western Kirkcaldy is one of 22 wards used to elect members of Fife Council. The ward elects three Councillors, covering the towns of Burntisland and Kinghorn, the village of Auchtertool, as well as the western outskirts of Kirkcaldy.

Councillors

Election Results

2022 Election
2022 Fife Council election

2017 Election

* = Sitting Councillor for Kirkcaldy Central.

2012 Election

2007 Election

References

Wards of Fife
Burntisland
Kinghorn
Kirkcaldy